Jelogir (also Romanized as Jelogīr and Jelowgīr) is a village in Margha Rural District, in the Central District of Izeh County, Khuzestan Province, Iran. At the 2006 census, its population was 103, in 17 families.

References 

Populated places in Izeh County